Wulfhelm or Wolfhelm is an Anglo-Saxon and German male name. It may refer to:

 Wulfhelm, Archbishop of Canterbury c. 926-941
 Wolfhelm of Brauweiler, d. 1091
 Wulfhelm of Hereford, d. c.937
 Wulfhelm II, Bishop of Wells, d. c.956

Germanic masculine given names
German masculine given names